Rollin' Plains is a 1938 American Western film directed by Albert Herman.

Plot
Texas Rangers Tex, Ananias and Pee Wee put down a range war between sheepmen and cattlemen.

Cast 
 Tex Ritter as Tex Lawrence
 White Flash as Tex's horse
 Horace Murphy as Ananias
 "Snub" Pollard as Pee Wee
 Harriet Bennet as Ruth Moody
 Hobart Bosworth as John "Gospel" Moody
 Ed Cassidy as Sheriff Tomlin
 Karl Hackett as Dan Barrow
 Charles King as Trigger Gargan
 Ernie Adams as Cain Moody
 Lynton Brent as Henchman Lope
 Horace B. Carpenter as Hank Tomlin
 The Beverly Hillbillies as Musicians

Soundtrack 
 Tex Ritter with The Beverly Hill Billies – "Me, My Pal and My Pony" (Written by Frank Harford)
 Tex Ritter – "Rollin' Plains" (Written by Walter G. Samuels, Leonard Whitcup and Teddy Powell)

External links 
 
 

1938 films
1938 Western (genre) films
1930s action films
1938 adventure films
American Western (genre) films
American action adventure films
American black-and-white films
American mystery films
Films directed by Albert Herman
Films set in Texas
Grand National Films films
1930s English-language films
1930s American films